Lê Thị Hà Thu (born 1992) is a Vietnamese model and beauty pageant titleholder who was appointed as Miss Earth Vietnam 2017. She represented Vietnam at the Miss Earth 2017.

Pageantry

Miss Ocean Vietnam 2014
Lê Thị Hà Thu has participated in Miss Ocean Vietnam 2014 and was crowned as the 1st Runner-up of the competition.

Miss Intercontinental Vietnam 2015
In 2015, she has appointed to be Miss Intercontinental Vietnam and represented Vietnam at Miss Intercontinental 2015 where she reached Top 17.

Miss Earth 2017
She competed at Miss Earth 2017 in the Philippines but she finished her participation as one of the Top 16.

References

External links

 

Miss Earth 2017 contestants
1992 births
Living people
Vietnamese female models
Vietnamese beauty pageant winners
21st-century Vietnamese women